Cherokee Comprehensive High School is a secondary school within the Hawkins County School System near Rogersville, Tennessee, United States.

History
Cherokee High School was founded in 1980 after the Hawkins County Board of Education had determined in the mid-1970s that it would be more cost effective for the school system to construct and operate two comprehensive high schools rather than the four community-based high schools it was then operating. The two schools would be centered in the western and eastern ends of the county, to service the county's two main population centers: Rogersville-Bulls Gap- Mooresburg and Church Hill-Mount Carmel-Surgoinsville.

The same population was being served by Rogersville High School and Bulls Gap High School prior to Cherokee's construction. So that these populations would still be served under the new plan, the Board of Education purchased land as equidistant from Rogersville and Bulls Gap as possible. The present site is located at the intersection of Highway 66 and Highway 70 in the community of Persia.

The school was named after nearby Cherokee Lake.

The high school added a freshman academy program in 2009.

Student demographics
According to a 2018–2019 report card from the Tennessee Department of Education, approximately 38.3% of Cherokee High students were considered to be "economically disadvantaged", as that term is defined by the Department. The same report indicates that, for 2018–2019, the student population was 51.7% male and (1077 total) Cherokee was distributed as follows:

Academics
According to information from a 2017–18 Tennessee Report Card, Cherokee students averaged 18.8 on the ACT. The report also states that attendance was 93.0% for 2017–18 and the 2017 graduation rate was 96.9%. In the decade after 2007, graduation rates rose over 34%.

Athletics
The school's mascot was derived from the old Rogersville High Warriors; its colors were taken from the orange and black of the old Bulls Gap High and the maroon and grey of the old Rogersville, to derive the red and black Cherokee Chiefs. Men's and women's varsity, junior varsity, and freshman teams compete in the Tennessee Secondary School Athletics Association Division I in the following classifications:

References in Popular Culture and Media 
Cherokee High School is one of the locations in the novel series "The Living Saga" by Jaron McFall.

References

External links
 Cherokee High School official website
 Hawkins County School System official website

Rogersville, Tennessee
Public high schools in Tennessee
Schools in Hawkins County, Tennessee
1980 establishments in Tennessee